Itthipol Yodprom, is a Thai professional footballer who plays as a midfielder for Thai Premier League club Osotspa Samut Prakan.

International career

Itthipol won the AFF U-19 Youth Championship with Thailand U19, and played in 2012 AFC U-19 Championship.

International goals

Under-19

Honours

International
Thailand U-19
 AFF U-19 Youth Championship: 2011

External links
 Profile at Goal

1994 births
Living people
Itthipol Yodprom
Itthipol Yodprom
Association football midfielders
Itthipol Yodprom
Itthipol Yodprom